Dominance may refer to:

Social relationships
 Dominance hierarchy or social hierarchy, an organizational form by which individuals within a community control the distribution of resources within the community
 Expressions of dominance in human relationships in general
 Dominance and submission, set of behaviors, customs, and rituals in an erotic or lifestyle context
 Social dominance theory, a theory of intergroup relations
 Social dominance orientation, a personality trait
 Abusive power and control, the way that an abusive person gains and maintains power and control over another person
Dual strategies theory, dominance and its counterpart prestige as two strategies for gaining status in human hierarchies

Science
 Dominance (psychology), assesses a person's characteristic feelings of control and influence over his life circumstances versus feelings of being controlled and influenced by others or events

Biology
 Dominance (ethology), in animal behaviour and anthropology, the level of social status relative to other individuals
 Dominance (ecology), the degree of predominance of one or a few species in an ecological community
 Dominance (genetics), a relationship between the effects of different versions of a gene

Mathematics 
 Strategic dominance, a method of simplification for games
 Stochastic dominance, a situation in which one lottery (a probability distribution of outcomes) can be ranked as superior to another, with only limited knowledge of preferences
 Dominance order, a partial order
 Dominance drawing, a style of graph drawing

Other
 Dominance (C++), an aspect of virtual inheritance in the C++ programming language
 Dominance (economics), in economics, the degree of inequality in market share distribution
 Strategic dominance, in game theory, when one strategy is better for one opponent regardless of the other opponent's strategy
 Dominance (linguistics), a relationship between syntactic nodes
 Dominance (geography), a radius used with topographic isolation

See also
 Dominate, mid-to-late Roman Empire order
 Domination (disambiguation)
 Dominator (disambiguation)
 World domination (disambiguation)
 Social dominance (disambiguation)